Vika Falileeva is a Russian model.

Early life and career
Falileeva was born in Irkutsk in 1992. She began modelling in 2008 at the age of 16. In July 2010, during Paris Couture Week, she walked for Elie Saab. Later this same year, she signed a contract with Ford Models, and in September participated in various high-profile shows such as Gianfranco Ferre, Jil Sander, Vera Wang, and Moschino in New York City and Milan, followed by the Givenchy Spring 2011 show in Paris a month later.

2011
In February, she walked for Alberta Ferretti and Giorgio Armani in New York and Milan. In July, she appeared on the cover of Amica magazine. Later this year, Falileeva left Ford Models, instead signing a contract with DNA. She subsequently had a career breakthrough, walking for Alexander Wang, Tommy Hilfiger, Marc Jacobs, Michael Kors, Oscar de la Renta, Rodarte, Giorgio Armani, Jil Sander, Louis Vuitton, Bottega Veneta, Dolce & Gabbana, Rochas and Valentino in September.

2012
In January, she appeared in a campaign for Blumarine, and also shot for the February editions of both British and Japanese Vogue.

2015 onwards
In December 2015, Falileeva and Czech model Hana Jirickova featured in an H&M campaign. In May 2016, she featured on the cover of the Russian edition of Allure. In 2017, she was photographed by Sergi Pons for El País newspaper, and in October of the same year, she walked for Pronovias at New York Bridal Fashion Week.

References

External links
Vika Falileeva

1992 births
Living people
People from Irkutsk
Russian female models
British Vogue